Liudmila Vauchok (born 19 June 1981) is Belarusian Paralympian. She competed at the 2008 Summer Paralympics, winning a silver medal, and at the  2012 Summer Paralympics, winning  a bronze medal. She qualified for the 2020 Summer Paralympics.

Career 
She had excelled in athletics and she had won the Belarusian national titles in runs between 1500 and 5000 meters distances before she injured her spine in 2001 and was forced to use a wheelchair. She stayed involved in sports after her injury winning podium finishes in national competitions in armwrestling, athletics and dance. She dominated especially in cross-country skiing.

Vauchok participated in the 2006 Winter Paralympics in Turin winning 10-kilometer skiing race and adding three bronzes.

In 2007, she finished second in the rowing world championships in Munich-Oberschleißheim in the women's single sculls Paralympic event.

Rowing was included into the 2008 Summer Paralympics program and Vauchok won silver medal in the women's single sculls event, the first ever Paralympic rowing final. She won a bronze medal in the 2012 Summer Paralympics.

References

External links 
 
 
  
 Zimbio wikizine of Liudmila Vauchok

1981 births
Living people
Belarusian female rowers
Belarusian female cross-country skiers
Paralympic gold medalists for Belarus
Paralympic silver medalists for Belarus
Paralympic bronze medalists for Belarus
Paralympic rowers of Belarus
Paralympic cross-country skiers of Belarus
Paralympic medalists in cross-country skiing
Paralympic medalists in rowing
Rowers at the 2008 Summer Paralympics
Rowers at the 2012 Summer Paralympics
Rowers at the 2020 Summer Paralympics
Cross-country skiers at the 2006 Winter Paralympics
Cross-country skiers at the 2010 Winter Paralympics
Cross-country skiers at the 2018 Winter Paralympics
Medalists at the 2006 Winter Paralympics
Medalists at the 2010 Winter Paralympics
Medalists at the 2008 Summer Paralympics
Medalists at the 2012 Summer Paralympics
World Rowing Championships medalists for Belarus